Khajwa, officially known as Azad Nagar khajwa, also known as khajwa is the largest town, Janpad panchayat and Nagar Panchayat in Chhatarpur district in the Indian state of Madhya Pradesh. It is 11 km from Khajuraho, 5 km from Rajnagar and 38 km from  district headquarters Chhatarpur.

Geographics 
It has an average elevation of 226 metres (741 feet). The khajwa town is divided into 20 wards for which elections are held every 5 years.

Demographics 
At the 2011 census, Khajwa had a population of 5892. Khjwa is the most populated town in Chhatarpur district.

Schools 
Khajwa primary school.
Bunryanpurwa primary school.
Government School Khajwa. 
Primary Child School in khajwa (1st to 5th class).
Government school Rajnagar

A high school opening was announced in 2018.

Hospital 
Government Hospital Khajwa.

Transport

Bus stop and bus stand 
 Rajnagar bus stand. 
 Khajuraho bus stand.
 Khajwa chauraha bus stop.

Train 
 Rajnagar railway station.
 Khajuraho railway station.

Airport 
 Khajuraho airport.

References 

Bundelkhand
Chhatarpur
Cities and towns in Chhatarpur district